On 25 June 2022, two people were killed and twenty-one people were wounded in a mass shooting in Oslo, Norway. Police are treating the incident as an "act of Islamist terrorism". The target may have been the Oslo LGBTQ pride event, which was hosted by the local branch of the Norwegian Organisation for Sexual and Gender Diversity.

Police arrested Zaniar Matapour, a Norwegian citizen from Sanandaj, Iran, who had lived in Norway since 1991. They later confirmed that they had known of Matapour since 2015, saying that he had been radicalized into Islamic extremism. They also said he had a "history of violence and threats", as well as mental health issues. He has been charged with murder, attempted murder, and terrorism.

Shooting
The shooting occurred at locations associated with Oslo Pride, the local LGBT pride event hosted by the Oslo branch of the Norwegian Organisation for Sexual and Gender Diversity, the night before the planned pride parade in Oslo. The first shooting occurred at London Pub, a popular gay bar, and nightclub. A journalist from the Norwegian public broadcaster NRK who was present stated he witnessed a man arrive with a bag, then pick up a weapon and start shooting. The journalist thought it was an air gun at first, until the glass shattered at the bar next door. According to one witness, the perpetrator shouted "Allahu Akbar" as he started shooting.

The perpetrator then moved to two more nearby locations, including the bar Per på hjørnet and a takeaway restaurant. Police were called at 01:15 local time and arrived minutes later. The suspect was detained five minutes after the shooting. 80 to 100 people hid in the pub's basement during the attack, and wounded people were lying both inside and outside the bar with the police describing the scene as "chaotic".

Victims 
Two people were killed and twenty-one others injured, ten of whom were critically injured while the other eleven were slightly injured. The deceased victims were a 60-year-old man, killed at the London Pub, and a 54-year-old man, killed at the Per på hjørnet bar. Both victims resided in Bærum.

Oslo University Hospital reported that it had gone on red alert following the attack. Ten people received medical treatment for serious injuries. According to Eskil Pedersen, a number of those present in London Pub, including himself, were also on Utøya during the shooting by domestic terrorist Anders Behring Breivik.

Investigation 
At a press conference on 25 June 2022, the police said that they believe the attack could be motivated by anti-LGBT hate, and be intended to target Oslo Pride. Norway has seen sustained attacks against the LGBT community and the Pride event from anti-LGBT extremists on social media. Scholar  said that the attack took place in the context of attacks on LGBT minorities and rights by the anti-gender movement in Norway. The head of the Norwegian government's Extremism Commission, Cathrine Thorleifsson, as well as Amnesty International, linked the attack to a pattern of increased attacks on LGBT+ people in Norway and Europe, both on extremist online forums and open social media platforms.

Matapour's lawyer John Christian Elden said they have suspended the interrogations because Matapour is afraid that the police are manipulating it. Elden told Aftenposten that Matapour is afraid that the police will switch the recorded tapes and demands that everything must be written down. Elden confirmed that Matapour will be interrogated on Sunday morning, though it was later confirmed that he refused to appear for questioning, adding an additional demand—that his interrogation be made public in its entirety.

In February 2023, media said that on 19 June, an islamist contacted a person on the chat service, Telegram; the person contacted was an undercover agent of the Norwegian Intelligence Service; the islamist wanted contact with IS and wrote to the agent that some "brothers" were planning an operation in Europe; the islamist said that the "brothers" had two requests: They  wanted approval from IS, prior to the operation, and the "brothers" also requested that the terror organisation would take responsibility for the attack, afterwards, according to the information of newspaper VG; At the same time, the intelligence service  knew the identity of the islamist, even though he was using a handle/pseudonym (kallenavn); the agency also suspected who was pulling the strings (bakmann): Arfan Bhatti. After the attack, the islamist (but not Bhatti) sent a news-article about the attack, to the undercover agent; Shortly after the attack, Bhatti was put into contact with an undercover agent who was posing as "an emir, a leader of The Islamic State"; the contact was established as a result of the dialogue between the (first-mentioned) islamist and the (first-mentioned) undercover agent; the "fake emir" and Bhatti, kept in touch, for at least 8 weeks after the attack.

Accused

The suspect was identified as a 42-year-old Norwegian Kurd, Zaniar Matapour (born June 27, 1979), who moved from Iran to Norway in 1991 when he was 12. He has been charged with murder, attempted murder, and acts of terrorism. It is still unknown whether Matapour had accomplices.

Matapour had an extensive criminal background from drug and assault offenses, but had received only "minor convictions" prior to the attack, according to a Norwegian prosecutor. His mother said that he had previously been diagnosed with paranoid schizophrenia.

According to the public broadcaster NRK, Matapour has been in contact with Arfan Bhatti, an Islamist extremist with several convictions for violence. On 14 June, Bhatti, who has also been represented by Elden in the past, posted a burning rainbow flag with a caption calling for the killing of LGBT+ people on Facebook. Bhatti is a leading figure in Profetens Ummah, which has recruited people for Islamic State. Verdens Gang reported that Matapour had been stopped by police in April when he was in the same car as Bhatti. The police later confirmed that they had known of the suspect since 2015, believing that he had been radicalised into Islamic extremism.

On 23 September, police stated Arfan Bhatti was suspected of involvement in the shooting, and that an arrest warrant had been issued regarding him. In the autumn of 2022, Bhatti was arrested by police in Pakistan; he was still in police custody as of February 2023.

Aftermath
The pride parade and related events scheduled to be held in Oslo were cancelled after the shooting. National Police Chief, Benedicte Bjoernland, said in a statement that all Pride events in Norway should be postponed, since the LGBT community is considered the "enemy" by Islamist extremists. Police also advised people to celebrate Pride in smaller groups. Despite warnings, several thousand people still attended a makeshift parade, with armed police in the lead, and laid down rainbow flags as well as flowers at London Pub.

The National Police Commissioner Marie Benedicte Bjørnland announced a temporary nationwide arming of police officers in Norway. Additionally, Norway entered its highest terror alert level, although the Norwegian Police Security Service had "no indication" further attacks were likely to happen.

The Oslo Pride organisation organised a "Rainbow parade" walk for 10 September.

Reactions

Domestic 

Norwegian Prime Minister Jonas Gahr Støre called the shooting a "terrible attack on innocent people", and expressed solidarity with the LGBT community. He added that the fight against hate was not over, but that it could be overcome together. Støre reiterated that while the perpetrator had Islamist motivations, the attack was the fault of an individual and not Norway's Muslim community. In his speech on the anniversary of the 2011 Norway attacks, the Prime Minister said that "we know that queer people are the targets of hate, threats and violence. The incitement of hate is especially virulent against trans people. We will not accept this in Norway. We will use the memory of 22 July, in respect for those we lost, to turn our backs on this hate." Støre also called on moderate Muslims to call out homophobic and transphobic attitudes and actions.

The president of the Norwegian Parliament Masud Gharahkhani, a Norwegian-Iranian, stated that it was "sad and unacceptable" that such a brutal attack could occur.

King Harald V stated that the attacks had horrified the royal family, and he expressed a need to stand together to defend freedom and diversity. Similarly, Crown Prince Haakon stated that Norway needed to protect the right "to love whomever we want".

Bishop Olav Fykse Tveit, the Preses of the Church of Norway, expressed his belief that love would gain new strength following the attack.

International 
Many leaders of other countries were shocked, and gave condolences; some, such as French President Emmanuel Macron, encouraged people to stand together. Ursula von der Leyen, president of the EU Commission, expressed that she was shocked by the attack. Finnish President Sauli Niinistö and Prime Minister Sanna Marin gave their condolences on Twitter and condemned all forms of terrorism.

John Kirby, a White House spokesperson, stated that the White House was "horrified" by the shooting and expressed solidarity with Norway and the LGBT community.

See also 

 2022 Bratislava shooting

References

June 2022 events in Norway
June 2022 crimes in Europe
2022 in LGBT history
2022 mass shootings in Europe
2022 shootings
Attacks on bars in Europe
Attacks on nightclubs
2022 shootings
Deaths by firearm in Norway
Islamic terrorism and Norway
Islamic terrorist incidents in 2022
LGBT and Islam
LGBT in Norway
Mass shootings in Norway
Spree shootings in Norway
Terrorist incidents in Europe in 2022
Violence against LGBT people in Europe
2022 murders in Norway